Luis Gianneo (9 January 1897 – 15 August 1968) was an Argentine composer, pianist and conductor. As music educator, he was the teacher of composers Ariel Ramirez, Juan Carlos Zorzi, Marta Lambertini,  and Rodolfo Arizaga, among others. Founder of Orquesta Juvenil de Radio Nacional and co-founder of Symphonic Orchestra of Tucumán.

Gianneo is acknowledged as a leading Argentine composer and one of the most influential members of the Grupo renovación, which he joined in 1931. He composed nearly 100 works including every genre except opera. His earliest compositions exhibit the influence of indigenous culture and landscape of northwest Argentina; after joining the Grupo renovación, he adopted a neoclassical approach; in 1960 he traveled to Europe, where he met Goffredo Petrassi and Luigi Dallapiccola, who brought his attention to the post-war avant-gardists and prompted him to incorporate a dissonant atonal language and free use of serialism in his late works.

Homage
To commemorate the 50th anniversary of his death, with two concerts in the Salón Dorado of the Teatro Colón, on 4 August and on 25 August 2018 respectively, the Cuarteto Gianneo performed the world premiere of his complete works for string quartet, including the four strings quartets, Three Creole Pieces, and Four Incaicos Songs.

Works
 Suite (1933)
 El Tarco en Flor (1930)
 Pampeanas
 Turay-Turay (1927)
 Tres piezas criollas for string quartet (1936)
 Cuarteto Criollo No. 1 for strings (1936)
 Obertura para una Comedia Infantil, (1937)
 Sonatina, (1938)
 Cinco pequeñas piezas, (1938)
 Concertino-Serenata (1938)
 Sonata No. 2 for piano (1943)
 Concierto Aymará for violin and orchestra, (1942)
 Cuarteto Criollo No. 2 (1948) for strings
 Improvisación, (1948)
 Variaciones sobre un tema de tango
 String Quartet No. 3 (1952)
 Piano Sonata No. 3, (1957)
 Seis Bagatelas, (1957–1959)
   String Quartet No. 4 (1963)
 Antífona, symphony
 Agnus Dei, cantata
 Poema de la Saeta
 Obertura del Sesquicentenario

References

Works cited

Argentine conductors (music)
Male conductors (music)
1968 deaths
1897 births
Argentine pianists
Argentine classical composers
Musicians from Buenos Aires
20th-century conductors (music)
20th-century pianists
20th-century classical composers
Male classical composers
Argentine people of Italian descent
Argentine music educators
Male pianists
20th-century male musicians